Pollex merisulawesii is a moth of the family Erebidae first described by Michael Fibiger in 2007. It is known from south-western Sulawesi in Indonesia.

The wingspan is about 11 mm. The forewing is narrow and blackish brown. The hindwing is unicolorous dark brown with an indistinct black discal spot and the underside unicolorous dark brown.

References

Micronoctuini
Taxa named by Michael Fibiger
Moths described in 2007